Voronezh is a city and the administrative centre of Voronezh Oblast in southwestern Russia straddling the Voronezh River, located  from where it flows into the Don River. The city sits on the Southeastern Railway, which connects western Russia with the Urals and Siberia, the Caucasus and Ukraine, and the M4 highway (Moscow–Voronezh–Rostov-on-Don–Novorossiysk). In recent years the city has experienced rapid population growth, rising in 2021 to 1,057,681, up from 889,680 recorded in the 2010 Census; making it the fourteenth most populous city in the country.

Geography

Urban layout
Information about the original urban layout of Voronezh is contained in the "Patrol Book" of 1615. At that time, the city fortress was logged and located on the banks of the Voronezh River. In plan, it was an irregular quadrangle with a perimeter of about 130 fathoms (238 m), that is, it was very small: inside it, due to lack of space, there was no housing or siege yards, and even the cathedral church was supposed to be taken out. However, at this small fortress there was a large garrison - 666 households of service people. These courtyards were reliably protected by the second line of fortifications by a standing prison on taras with 25 towers covered with earth; behind the prison was a moat, and beyond the moat there were stakes. Voronezh was a typical military settlement, which is clearly evidenced by the decisive predominance of service people in its population (about 70%), mainly "by device". In the city prison there were only settlements of military men: Streletskaya, Kazachya, Belomestnaya atamanskaya, Zatinnaya and Pushkarskaya; The posad population received the territory between the ostrog and the river, where the Monastyrskaya settlements (at the Assumption Monastery) was formed. Subsequently, the Yamnaya Sloboda was added to them, and on the other side of the fort, on the Chizhovka Mountain, the Chizhovskaya Sloboda of archers and Cossacks appeared. As a result, the Voronezh settlements surrounded the fortress in a ring. The location of the parish churches emphasized this ring-like and even distribution of settlements: the Ilyinsky Church of the Streletskaya Sloboda, the Pyatnitskaya Cossack and Pokrovskaya Belomestnaya were brought out to the passage towers of the prison. The Nikolskaya Church of the Streletskaya Sloboda was located near the marketplace (and, accordingly, the front facade of the fortress), and the paired ensemble of the Rozhdestvenskaya and Georgievskaya churches of the Cossack Sloboda marked the main street of the city, going from the Cossack Gate to the fortress tower.

History

Foundation and name
 
The first chronicle references to the word "Voronezh" are dated 1177, when the Ryazan prince Yaropolk, having lost the battle, fled "to Voronozh" and there was moving "from town to town" Modern data of archeology and history interpret Voronezh as a geographical region, which included the Voronezh river (tributary of the Don) and a number of settlements. In the lower reaches of the river, a unique Slavic town-planning complex of the 8th – early 11th century was discovered, which covered the territory of the present city of Voronezh and its environs (about 42 km long, about 13 forts and many unfortified villages). By the 12th – 13th centuries, most of the old towns were desolate, but new settlements appeared upstream, closer to Ryazan.

For many years, the hypothesis of the Soviet historian Vladimir Zagorovsky dominated: he produced the toponym "Voronezh" from the hypothetical Slavic personal name Voroneg. This man allegedly gave the name of a small town in the Chernigov Principality (now the village of Voronezh in Ukraine). Later, in the 11th or 12th century, the settlers were able to "transfer" this name to the Don region, where they named the second city Voronezh, and the river got its name from the city. However, now many researchers criticize the hypothesis, since in reality neither the name of Voroneg nor the second city was revealed, and usually the names of Russian cities repeated the names of the rivers, but not vice versa.

The linguistic comparative analysis of the name "Voronezh" was carried out by the Khovansky Foundation in 2009. There is an indication of the place names of many countries in Eurasia, which may partly be not only similar in sound, but also united by common Indo-European languages: Varanasi, Varna, Verona, Brno, etc.

A comprehensive scientific analysis was conducted in 2015–2016 by the historian Pavel Popov. His conclusion: "Voronezh" is a probable Slavic macrotoponym associated with outstanding signs of nature, has a root voron- (from the proto-Slavic vorn) in the meaning of "black, dark" and the suffix -ezh (-azh, -ozh). It was not “transferred” and in the 8th - 9th centuries it marked a vast territory covered with black forests (oak forests) - from the mouth of the Voronezh river to the Voronozhsky annalistic forests in the middle and upper reaches of the river, and in the west to the Don (many forests were cut down). The historian believes that the main "city" of the early town-planning complex could repeat the name of the region – Voronezh. Now the hillfort is located in the administrative part of the modern city, in the Voronezh upland oak forest. This is one of Europe's largest ancient Slavic hillforts, the area of which – more than 9 hectares – 13 times the area of the main settlement in Kyiv before the baptism of Rus.

In  it is assumed that the word "Voronezh" means bluing - a technique to increase the corrosion resistance of iron products. This explanation fits well with the proximity to the ancient city of Voronezh of a large iron deposit and the city of Stary Oskol.

Folk etymology claims the name comes from combining the Russian words for raven (ворон) and hedgehog (еж) into Воронеж. According to this explanation two Slavic tribes named after the animals used this combination to name the river which later in turn provided the name for a settlement. There is not believed to be any scientific support for this explanation.

In the 16th century, the Middle Don basin, including the Voronezh river, was  gradually conquered by Muscovy from the Nogai Horde (a successor state of the Golden Horde), and the current city of Voronezh was established in 1585 by Feodor I as a fort protecting the  Muravsky Trail trade route against the raids of the Nogai and Crimean Tatars. The city was named after the river.

17th to 20th centuries

In the 17th century, Voronezh gradually evolved into a sizable town.
Weronecz is shown on the Worona river in Resania in Joan Blaeu's map of 1645.
Peter the Great built a dockyard in Voronezh where the Azov Flotilla was constructed for the Azov campaigns in 1695 and 1696. This fleet, the first ever built in Russia, included the first Russian ship of the line, Goto Predestinatsia. The Orthodox diocese of Voronezh was instituted in 1682 and its first bishop, Mitrofan of Voronezh, was later proclaimed the town's patron saint.

Owing to the Voronezh Admiralty Wharf, for a short time, Voronezh became the largest city of South Russia and the economic center of a large and fertile region. In 1711, it was made the seat of the Azov Governorate, which eventually morphed into the Voronezh Governorate.

In the 19th century, Voronezh was a center of the Central Black Earth Region. Manufacturing industry (mills, tallow-melting, butter-making, soap, leather, and other works) as well as bread, cattle, suet, and the hair trade developed in the town. A railway connected Voronezh with Moscow in 1868 and Rostov-on-Don in 1871.

During World War II, Voronezh was the scene of fierce fighting between Russian and combined Axis troops. The Germans used it as a staging area for their attack on Stalingrad, and made it a key crossing point on the Don River. In June 1941, two BM-13 (Fighting machine #13 Katyusha) artillery installations were built at the Voronezh excavator factory. In July, the construction of Katyushas was rationalized so that their manufacture became easier and the time of volley repetition was shortened from five minutes to fifteen seconds. More than 300 BM-13 units manufactured in Voronezh were used in a counterattack near Moscow in December 1941. In October 22, 1941, the advance of the German troops prompted the establishment of a defense committee in the city. On November 7, 1941, there was a troop parade, devoted to the anniversary of the October Revolution. Only three such parades were organized that year: in Moscow, Kuybyshev, and Voronezh. In late June 1942, the city was attacked by German and Hungarian forces. In response, Soviet forces formed the Voronezh Front. By July 6, the German army occupied the western river-bank suburbs before being subjected to a fierce Soviet counter-attack. By July 24 the frontline had stabilised along the Voronezh River as the German forces continued southeast into the Great Bend of the Don. The attack on Voronezh represented the first phase of the German Army's 1942 campaign in the Soviet Union, codenamed Case Blue.

Until January 25, 1943, parts of the Second German Army and the Second Hungarian Army occupied the western part of Voronezh. During Operation Little Saturn, the Ostrogozhsk–Rossosh Offensive, and the Voronezhsko-Kastornenskoy Offensive, the Voronezh Front exacted heavy casualties on Axis forces. On January 25, 1943, Voronezh was liberated after ten days of combat. During the war the city was almost completely ruined, with 92% of all buildings destroyed.

1950s–2000s
By 1950, Voronezh had been rebuilt. Most buildings and historical monuments were repaired. It was also the location of a prestigious Suvorov Military School, a boarding school for young boys who were considered to be prospective military officers, many of whom had been orphaned by war.

In 1950–1960, new factories were established: a tire factory, a machine-tool factory, a factory of heavy mechanical pressing, and others.
In 1968, Serial production of the Tupolev Tu-144 supersonic plane was established at the Voronezh Aviation factory. In October 1977, the first Soviet domestic wide-body plane, Ilyushin Il-86, was built there.

In 1989, TASS published details of an alleged UFO landing in the city's park and purported encounters with extraterrestrial beings reported by a number of children. A Russian scientist that was cited in initial TASS reports later told the Associated Press that he was misquoted, cautioning, "Don't believe all you hear from TASS," and "We never gave them part of what they published", and a TASS correspondent admitted the possibility that some "make-believe" had been added to the TASS story, saying, "I think there is a certain portion of truth, but it is not excluded that there is also fantasizing".

2010s

From 10 to 17 September 2011, Voronezh celebrated its 425th anniversary. The anniversary of the city was given the status of a federal scale celebration that helped attract large investments from the federal and regional budgets for development.

On December 17, 2012, Voronezh became the fifteenth city in Russia with a population of over one million people.

Today Voronezh is the economic, industrial, cultural, and scientific center of the Central Black Earth Region. As part of the annual tradition in the Russian city of Voronezh, every winter the main city square is thematically drawn around a classic literature. In 2020, the city was decorated using the motifs from Pyotr Ilyich Tchaikovsky's The Nutcracker. In the year of 2021, the architects drew inspiration from Hans Christian Andersen's fairy tale The Snow Queen as well as the animation classic The Snow Queen from the Soviet Union. The fairy tale replica city will feature the houses of Kai and Gerda, the palace of the snow queen, an ice rink, and illumination.

Administrative and municipal status

Voronezh is the administrative center of the oblast. Within the framework of administrative divisions, it is incorporated as Voronezh Urban Okrug—an administrative unit with the status equal to that of the districts. As a municipal division, this administrative unit also has urban okrug status.

City divisions
The city is divided into six administrative districts:
 Zheleznodorozhny (183,17 km²)
 Tsentralny (63,96 km²)
 Kominternovsky (47,41 km²)
 Leninsky (18,53 km²)
 Sovetsky (156,6 km²)
 Levoberezhny (123,89 km²)

Demographics

At the time of the official 2010 Census, the ethnic makeup of the city's population whose ethnicity was known (877,868) was:

Note: 1926–1970 and 2016 are population estimates; 1989 is the Soviet Census; 2002 and 2010 are census urban population only.

Economy
The leading sectors of the urban economy in the 20th century were mechanical engineering, metalworking, the electronics industry and the food industry.

In the city are such companies as:
 Voronezh Aircraft Production Association (where, amongst other types, the Tupolev Tu-144 was built)

 Voronezhselmash (agricultural engineering)
 Sozvezdie (headquarter, JSC Concern “Sozvezdie”, in 1958 the world's first created mobile telephony and wireless telephone Altai
 Verofarm (pharmaceutics, owner Abbott Laboratories),
 Voronezh Mechanical Plant (production of missile and aircraft engines, oil and gas equipment)
 Mining Machinery Holding - RUDGORMASH (production of drilling, mineral processing and mining equipment)
 VNiiPM Research Institute of Semiconductor Engineering (equipment for plasma-chemical processes, technical-chemical equipment for liquid operations, water treatment equipment)
 KBKhA Chemical Automatics Design Bureau with notable products:.
 Pirelli Voronezh.

On the territory of the city district government Maslovka Voronezh region with the support of the Investment Fund of Russia, is implementing a project to create an industrial park, "Maslowski", to accommodate more than 100 new businesses, including the transformer factory of Siemens. On September 7, 2011 in Voronezh there opened a Global network operation center of Nokia Siemens Networks, which was the fifth in the world and the first in Russia.

Construction
In 2014, 926,000 square meters of housing was delivered.

Clusters of Voronezh
In clusters of tax incentives and different preferences, the full support of the authorities.
A cluster of Oil and Gas Equipment, Radio-electronic cluster, Furniture cluster, IT cluster, Cluster aircraft, Cluster Electromechanics, Transport and logistics cluster, Cluster building materials and technologies.

Transportation

Air
The city is served by the Voronezh International Airport, which is located north of the city and is home to Polet Airlines. Voronezh is also home to the Pridacha Airport, a part of a major aircraft manufacturing facility VASO (Voronezhskoye Aktsionernoye Samoletostroitelnoye Obshchestvo, Voronezh aircraft production association) where the Tupolev Tu-144 (known in the West as the "Concordski"), was built and the only operational unit is still stored. Voronezh also hosts the Voronezh Malshevo air force base in the southwest of the city, which, according to a Natural Resources Defense Council report, houses nuclear bombers.

Rail
Since 1868, there is a railway connection between Voronezh and Moscow. Rail services form a part of the South Eastern Railway of the Russian Railways. Destinations served direct from Voronezh include Moscow, Kyiv, Kursk, Novorossiysk, Sochi, and Tambov.
The main train station is called Voronezh-1 railway station and is located in the center of the city.

Bus
There are three Bus Stations in Voronezh that connect the city with a large number of destinations including Moscow, Belgorod, Lipetsk, Volgograd, Rostov-on-Don, Astrakhan and many more.

Climate
Voronezh experiences a humid continental climate (Köppen: Dfb) with long, cold winters and short, warm summers.

Education and culture

The city has seven theaters, twelve museums, a number of movie theaters, a philharmonic hall, and a circus. It is also a major center of higher education in central Russia. The main educational facilities include:

 Voronezh State University
 Voronezh State Technical University
 Voronezh State University of Architecture and Construction
 Voronezh State Pedagogical University
 Voronezh State Agricultural University
 Voronezh State University of Engineering Technologies
 Voronezh State Medical University named after N. N. Burdenko
 Voronezh State Academy of Arts
 Voronezh State University of Forestry and Technologies named after G.F. Morozov
 Voronezh State Institute of Physical Training
 Voronezh Institute of Russia's Home Affairs Ministry
 Voronezh Institute of High Technologies
 Military Educational and Scientific Center of the Air Force «N.E. Zhukovsky and Y.A. Gagarin Air Force Academy» (Voronezh)
 Plekhanov Russian University of Economics (Voronezh branch)
 Russian State University of Justice
 Admiral Makarov State University of Sea and River Fleet (Voronezh branch)
 International Institute of Computer Technologies
 Voronezh Institute of Economics and Law

and a number of other affiliate and private-funded institutes and universities. There are 2000 schools within the city.

Theaters
 Voronezh Chamber Theatre
 Koltsov Academic Drama Theater
 Voronezh State Opera and Ballet Theatre
 Shut Puppet Theater

Festivals
Platonov International Arts Festival

Sports

Religion

Orthodox Christianity is the predominant religion in Voronezh.
There is an Orthodox Jewish community in Voronezh, with a synagogue located on Stankevicha Street.

In 1682, the Voronezh diocese was formed to fight the schismatics. Its first head was Bishop Mitrofan (1623-1703) at the age of 58. Under him, the construction began on the new Annunciation Cathedral to replace the old one. In 1832, Mitrofan was canonized by the Russian Orthodox Church.

In the 1990s, many Orthodox churches were returned to the diocese. Their restoration was continued. In 2009, instead of the lost one, a new Annunciation Cathedral was built with a monument to St. Mitrofan erected next to it.

Cemeteries
There are ten cemeteries in Voronezh:
Levoberezhnoye Cemetery
Lesnoye Cemetery
Jewish Cemetery
Nikolskoye Cemetery
Pravoberezhnoye Cemetery
Budyonnovskoe Cemetery
Yugo-Zapadnoye Cemetery
Podgorenskоye Cemetery
Kominternovskoe Cemetery

Ternovoye Cemetery is а historical site closed to the public.

Notable people

Sister Cities
Source:

References

Notes

Sources

Further reading

Charlotte Hobson's book, Black Earth City, is an account of life in Voronezh at the time of the fall of the Soviet Union based on her experiences after spending a year in Voronezh as a foreign student in 1991–1992.
Nadezhda Mandelstam's Hope Against Hope, the first volume of her memoirs concerning her husband, the poet Osip Mandelstam, provides many details about life in Voronezh in the 1930s under Stalinist rule.

External links

 
Official website of Voronezh
Official website of Voronezh 
Unofficial website of Voronezh 
Voronezh State University
Panoramic views of Voronezh

 
Archaeological sites in Russia
Populated places established in 1586
Voronezhsky Uyezd